Puebla is one of the smallest states of Mexico. Despite that, it is the sixth most populous state, with approximately 6 million persons. Puebla is also the second state with higher number of municipalities, only behind the state of Oaxaca. The municipalities of Puebla are grouped into seven regions.

Region I - Huauchinango

Region II - Teziutlán

Region III - Ciudad Serdán

Region IV - San Pedro Cholula

Region V - Puebla

Region VI - Izúcar de Matamoros

Region VII - Tehuacán

Government of Puebla